Freedom Fighter, Lee Hoe-young is a 2010 South Korean historical television series, starring Jung Dong-hwan, Ahn Jae-mo, Lee Ah-yi, Hong Il-kwon and Kwon Oh-joong. Based on the life of Korean independence fighter Lee Hoe-yeong, the drama was made to commemorate the centenary of the Forced Annexation of Korea by Japan. Its premiere coincided with the signing of the annexation treaty on August 21, 1910, and the drama aired on KBS1 from August 29 to September 12, 2010 on Saturdays and Sundays at 21:05 for 5 episodes.

This was the third and last of the "noblesse oblige" series produced by KBS in 2010, following The Reputable Family and The Great Merchant.

At the end of the drama, a short documentary about Lee Hoe-young aired, including an interview with his sons, Lee Kyu-chang and Lee Kyu-dong.

Synopsis
When Japan invaded Korea, Lee Hoe-young donated all of his savings and moved to Manchuria to open a school. There, he trained soldiers and scholars who later led the army to win numerous battles during the early 20th century. Lee also joined the underground anarchist movement in Shanghai to fight against Japanese forces. Lee later died in prison after being captured and tortured by the Japanese army. The drama begins from the point of view of Japanese war correspondent Kimura Junpei, who is writing his report "Lee Hoe-young, the Terrorist." But as he delves into the life of Lee, he comes to understand and admire Lee Hoe-young as a freedom fighter who led the Korean independence movement.

Cast
(Names in bold are based on the actual person; pen names are listed in quotation marks for some of the characters)
 Jung Dong-hwan as "Woodang" Lee Hoe-young (1867–1932)
 Ahn Jae-mo as Kimura Junpei
 Lee Ah-yi as Hong Jung-hwa
 Hong Il-kwon as "Hwaam" Jung Hyun-sub (1896–1981)
 Kwon Oh-joong as "Gupa" Baek Jung-ki (1896–1934)
 Choi Ik-joon as Lee Yong-joon
 Jung Seung-woo as Yoo Ki-moon
 Kim Kang-il as Sano
 Lee Jung-hwan as Hwa Kyoon-shil
 Lee Dae-ro as Lee Suk-yeong (1855–1934, Lee Hoe-young's older brother)
 Kim Jong-chan as Lee Kyu-chang (1913–2005, Lee Hoe-young's eldest son)
 Jun Kwang-jin as Lee Kyu-seo (1912-1933, Lee Hoe-young's nephew, Lee Suk-yeong's son)
 Jung Jong-ryul as Hong Heung-soon
 Jo Young-jin as "Seongjae" Lee Si-yeong (1868–1953, Lee Hoe-young's younger brother, the future Vice President of the Republic of Korea)
 Choi Il-hwa as General Kimura Endo (Junpei's father)
 Kim Kyu-chul as Asahi Shimbun Shanghai bureau chief
 Kim Ha-kyun as Ok Kwan-bin (owner of a pharmaceutical company in Shanghai)
 Jang Joon-ho as Suzuki
 Lee Jung-gil as consulate staff
 Kim Eung-soo as Captain (later Major) Mitsuwa / Kim Pan-chul (Japanese counterintelligence corps officer)
 Kim Byung-ki as Gunnery Captain Okuma
 Go In-beom as Wang Ah-cho
 Jung Heung-chae as Wang Jung-wi
 Kim Kyung-ryong as Dam-yeob
 Lee Young-hoo as "Baekbeom" Kim Gu (1876–1949, 6th, 12th, 13th and last President of the Provisional Government of the Republic of Korea)

References

External links
 Freedom Fighter, Lee Hoe-young official KBS website 
 

Korean Broadcasting System television dramas
2010 South Korean television series debuts
20th century in Korea
History of Manchuria in television
Second Sino-Japanese War television drama series
South Korean historical television series
Television series set in Korea under Japanese rule
Television shows set in Shanghai
Korean-language television shows
2010 South Korean television series endings